Raunaq Kamdar (born 1986) is an Indian actor known for his work in Gujarati cinema and Gujarati theatre.

Early life 
Born in 1986 at Mumbai, Kamdar completed his schooling at St. Xavier’s High School, Ahmedabad, and studied architecture at CEPT University, Ahmedabad.

Career 
He started his acting career in theatre in 2001 and directed several plays including Frigyes Karinthy's The Refund. The plays which he produced include Ismat Apa ke Naam, Katha Collage, Pune Highway, Class of 64, and The Interview. He started his film career with the 2016 Gujarati film Hu Tu Tu Tu – Aavi Ramat Ni Rutu (2016), and later played lead role in Tuu to Gayo (2016), Family Circus (2018), Have Thase Baap Re (2019), Order Order Out of Order (2019). He appeared in Ekvismu Tiffin (2021) directed by Vijaygiri Bava. He was praised for his role in Naadi Dosh (2022). He acted in Chabutro (2022).

Filmography

Web 

 Chaskela (on OHO Gujarati)
 ''Happy Family: Conditions Apply as Sanjuoy Dholakia

Theatre
He has played major role in several plays:

Recognition
Kamdar was featured on The Times 50 Most Desirable Men of India 2019. He was named as Gujarat's "Most Desirable Man of 2019" by Ahmedabad Times.

References

External links

Living people
Male actors in Gujarati-language films
Gujarati theatre
Male actors from Ahmedabad
Indian male stage actors
Indian male film actors
21st-century Indian male actors
1986 births